Oleacinidae is a taxonomic family of air-breathing land snails, terrestrial pulmonate gastropod mollusks in the clade Eupulmonata (according to the taxonomy of the Gastropoda by Bouchet & Rocroi, 2005).

Anatomy
In this family, the number of haploid chromosomes lies between 26 and 30 (according to the values in this table).

Taxonomy

2005 taxonomy 
The family Oleacinidae is classified within the informal group Sigmurethra, itself belonging to the clade Stylommatophora within the clade Eupulmonata (according to the taxonomy of the Gastropoda by Bouchet & Rocroi, 2005).

The family Oleacinidae consists of the following subfamilies (according to the taxonomy of the Gastropoda by Bouchet & Rocroi, 2005):
 Oleacininae H. Adams & A. Adams, 1855 - synonyms: Polyphemidae Gistel, 1868 (inv.); Glandinidae Bourguignat, 1877; Streptostylini H. B. Baker, 1941
 Euglandininae H. B. Baker, 1941
 Varicellinae H. B. Baker, 1941

2010 taxonomy 
Thompson (2010) have redefined subfamilies in Spiraxidae and have moved Euglandininae and Streptostylinae as subfamilies of Spiraxidae.

Genera 
Genera in the family Oleacinidae include:

subfamily Oleacininae
 Oleacina Röding, 1798 - type genus of the family Oleacinidae
 Palaeoglandina Wenz, 1914
 Pseudoleacina Wenz, 1914

subfamily Varicellinae
 Varicella L. Pfeiffer, 1854 - type genus of the subfamily Varicellinae
 Glandinella L. Pfeiffer, 1878
 Laevaricella Pilsbry, 1907
 Melaniella L. Pfeiffer, 1857
 Sigmataxis Pilsbry, 1907

References

External links